Sean M. Bennett (born May 13, 1968) is an American politician. He is a member of the South Carolina Senate from the 38th District, serving since 2012. He is a member of the Republican party.

References

Living people
1968 births
Republican Party South Carolina state senators
21st-century American politicians
People from Charleston, South Carolina
University of South Carolina alumni